Winston Audio was an indie rock and grunge rock band based in Atlanta, Georgia, that formed in 2001 and has existed in several incarnations since its creation. The band is currently signed to Favorite Gentlemen Recordings and is on an indefinite hiatus.

History

According to the band, Winston Audio "was formed in 2001, but the music they create today really began in 2006." In 2006, the band released its first EP, Come On, Hibernate, but the band remained largely silent until 2009, when they released The Red Rhythm. With the release of its first full-length album, Winston Audio has received generally favorable reviews, citing the band's unmistakable influences from 90's grunge rock. Winston Audio's sound has been described as hard rock with Southern rock and blues undertones.

Current Band members
 Daniel DeWitt (Lead Vocals/Bass/Guitar)

Former members
 Dan Gleason (-2010) (Guitar/Keys/Vocals)
 Zach Brown  (-2010) (Guitar)
 Shane Lenzen-O'Connell (2007–2010) (Drums)
 Gerren Fish (2001–2003) (Lead Vocals/Guitar)
 Randy Chester (2001) (Bass)
 Matt Hau (2001–2006) (Drums)
 Matt Keef (2002–2005) (Guitar)
 Chris Turner (2006–2007) (Guitar)
 Benji Lee (2006–2007) (Drums)
 Andy Lee (2007–2008) (Drums)
 Michael Adkins (2003–2009) (Guitar)

Tours

Winston Audio completed its first national tour with Manchester Orchestra, Audrye Sessions, and Fun in Summer 2009. In the fall of 2009, the band toured with Colour Revolt, UME and Meat Puppets.

Discography

Albums
2009: The Red Rhythm
2006: Come on, Hibernate

EPs
2006: Come On, Hibernate EP
2004: The First Quarter EP

References

External links
Official Website
Winston Audio at MySpace
Winston Audio at Favorite Gentlemen Records
Winston Audio at Facebook

Indie rock musical groups from Georgia (U.S. state)
Musical groups from Atlanta